Taberlaane is a village in Antsla Parish, Võru County in southeastern Estonia. It has a population of 96.

References

Villages in Võru County